Adrian David Sampson (born October 7, 1991) is an American professional baseball pitcher for the Chicago Cubs of Major League Baseball (MLB). He previously played in MLB for the Seattle Mariners and Texas Rangers, and in the KBO League for the Lotte Giants.

High school and college
Sampson attended Skyline High School in Sammamish, Washington. In July 2009, Sampson had Tommy John surgery, which caused him to miss his senior season. After not receiving any college baseball scholarships, Sampson attended Bellevue College. After going 4–2 with a 2.36 earned run average (ERA), Sampson was drafted by the Florida Marlins in the 16th round of the 2011 Major League Baseball draft. He did not sign with the Marlins and returned to Bellevue. In 2012, he went 13–0 with a 1.36 ERA and 107 strikeouts.

Professional career

Pittsburgh Pirates
Sampson was drafted by the Pittsburgh Pirates in the fifth round of the 2012 Major League Baseball draft and signed with the Pirates. He made his professional debut that season with the State College Spikes. He started nine of 11 games and had a 2.95 ERA.

Sampson played the 2013 season with the Bradenton Marauders, finishing 5-8 with a 5.14 ERA in 140 innings. He started the 2014 season with the Altoona Curve. In July he was selected to play in the Eastern League All-Star Game, but was forced to sit out the game by the Pirates. In August he was promoted to the Triple-A Indianapolis Indians after posting a 2.55 ERA with Altoona. Overall, he went 11–6 with a 2.96 ERA and 109 strikeouts.

Seattle Mariners
On July 31, 2015, Sampson was traded to the Seattle Mariners for J. A. Happ.

Sampson made his Major League debut on June 18, 2016 against the Boston Red Sox, relieving the injured Wade Miley. Scheduled to replace Miley in the rotation, Sampson suffered a torn flexor tendon while warming up before his first major league start five days later against the Detroit Tigers, which required season-ending surgery later that month.

Texas Rangers
On November 2, 2016, the Texas Rangers claimed Sampson off of waivers. In 2017, Sampson rehabbed from the torn flexor tendon injury and made eight minor league appearances that season, going 2-2 with a 3.45 ERA in 31.1 innings with the AZL Rangers, Down East Wood Ducks, and the Round Rock Express.

Sampson spent the first 5 months of the 2018 season with the AAA Round Rock Express, going 8-4 with a 3.77 ERA in 126.2 innings. 
Sampson was recalled to the Texas Rangers on September 4, and on September 11, 2018 Sampson made his first career MLB start. Sampson finished 2018 with a 0-3 record and a 4.30 ERA in 23 major league innings. Sampson was non-tendered by Texas after the 2018 season, and became a free agent on November 30, 2018.

On December 27, 2018, Sampson re-signed with the Rangers on a minor league contract with an invite to major league spring training. Sampson was assigned to the AAA Nashville Sounds on March 28, 2019. On April 1, 2019, the Rangers purchased Sampson's contract and recalled him to the major league roster. On June 8, he recorded his first career complete game versus the Oakland Athletics.

Sampson finished the 2019 season going 6–8 with a 5.89 ERA over 125.1 innings.

Lotte Giants
On November 22, 2019, Sampson signed one-year contract with the Lotte Giants of the KBO League.

He was 9-12 with a 5.40 ERA.  He became a free agent following the season.

Chicago Cubs
In May 2021, Sampson signed a minor league contract with the Chicago Cubs organization. In AAA, he was 4-5 with a 4.96 ERA.  On August 18, his contract was selected by the Cubs. Sampson pitched to a 2.80 ERA with 28 strikeouts in 10 appearances with Chicago. On November 5, Sampson was outrighted off of the 40-man roster. 

He returned to the organization, signing a minor league contract in March 2022. On May 10, he was designated for assignment, and subsequently claimed via waivers by the Seattle Mariners three days later. Though Sampson was assigned to the Tacoma Rainiers, he did not play for the team before being designated for assignment a second time on May 21. He cleared waivers and was sent outright to Triple-A on May 24, but rejected the outright assignment a day later and elected free agency. On May 31, 2022, Sampson signed a minor league deal with the Chicago Cubs.

On November 18, 2022, Sampson signed a one-year, $1.9 million contract with the Cubs, avoiding arbitration.

References

External links

1991 births
Living people
Sportspeople from Redmond, Washington
Baseball players from Washington (state)
Major League Baseball pitchers
American expatriate baseball players in South Korea
Seattle Mariners players
Texas Rangers players
Lotte Giants players
Chicago Cubs players
Bellevue Bulldogs baseball players
State College Spikes players
Bradenton Marauders players
Altoona Curve players
Indianapolis Indians players
Tacoma Rainiers players
Scottsdale Scorpions players
Arizona League Rangers players
Down East Wood Ducks players
Round Rock Express players
Iowa Cubs players